Barbarosa is an unincorporated community in Guadalupe County, in the U.S. state of Texas.

History
A post office was established at Barbarosa in 1900, and only remained open a few months until it was discontinued. The community was probably named after Frederick Barbarossa, formally Frederick I, Holy Roman Emperor, having been originally settled chiefly by Germans.

References

Unincorporated communities in Guadalupe County, Texas
Unincorporated communities in Texas